The New Medium Helicopter (NMH) is a British military programme to procure a new medium-lift support helicopter to replace several existing helicopters operated by the Royal Air Force and British Army. It is expected the new aircraft will enter service during the mid-2020s.

Programme launch 
On 22 March 2021, the Ministry of Defence (MOD) published Defence in a Competitive Age, in which it indicated that it would invest in a new medium-lift helicopter during the mid-2020s. The Defence and Security Industrial Strategy, published at the same time, outlined that to maintain cost-effective access to upgrades and support for the helicopter fleet, the MOD's intention was to consolidate the existing fleet through the replacement of the Royal Air Force's 23 Westland Puma HC2, 3 Bell 412 Griffin and subsequently two other helicopter types, with a New Medium Helicopter (NMH). The defence press expect that the two other helicopter types to be replaced are the British Army's fleets of 3 Bell 212 and 6 Airbus AS365 Dauphin. In 2022, the MoD said they would purchase up to 44 of the NMH.

Despite the MOD at the time having yet to release a formal requirement, Airbus Helicopters, Leonardo and Sikorsky all displayed their proposals to meet the NMH requirement at the DSEI 2021 defence exhibition in September 2021.

In October 2021, the MOD indicated that no final decision had been taken on the method of procurement, but that the expectation was that it will be subject to a competition. A prior information notice was published by the MOD on 11 November 2021, which outlined the scope of the project and the intention to carry out early engagement with potential suppliers. The MOD indicated that it anticipated 36 to 44 new helicopters would be procured, as well as two cockpit flight simulators and one cabin simulator. At this stage the estimated cost of the contract was £1 billion and it was anticipated to run from October 2023 until October 2028.

The MOD published a contract notice on 18 May 2022, officially commencing the competition and confirming the intention to acquire up to 44 aircraft. The contact would also include air and ground crew training as well as in-service technical support and maintenance. The contract would now be worth between £900 million and £1.2 billion. Although no contract start date was indicated, it is specified as running for seven years from the date of award. Invitations to tender are expected to be issued by the MOD by 30 September 2022.

Contenders 
As of November 2022, the following four aircraft had been offered by their respective manufacturers to meet the anticipated requirement.

Airbus Helicopters H175M 

European multinational company Airbus Helicopters – "a military version of the H175, designated as the H175M"

Boeing MH-139 Grey Wolf 

American company Boeing offers its MH-139 Grey Wolf for the UK New Medium Helicopter (NMH) requirements, which was the winner of a US Air Force competition to replace the Vietnam-era Bell UH-1Ns.

Leonardo AW149 

Italian based manufacturer Leonardo intend on offering the AW149. It is currently operated by the Royal Thai Army and Egyptian Navy. Leonardo has indicated that it would assemble the AW149 at a new assembly-line at its Yeovil facility in Somerset, England. Leonardo's 31 March 2022 press release confirmed that Yeovil will act as a 'final assembly facility' due to Italy's investment in their main AW189/AW149 production line in Brindisi, Italy. In July 2022 Poland ordered 32 AW149 helicopters with production at Leonardo's PZL Świdnik factory. The contract has a value of $1.85 billion (€1.76 billion).

Sikorsky S-70 Black Hawk 

Sikorsky highlighted that the Black Hawk was designed as a military helicopter, rather than being a military version of a civilian airframe and that it was combat proven. Entering service in 1979, the Black Hawk is operated by 29 countries, including by the US military which had over 2,000 examples across a range of variants. In 2019 and 2022 Philippines orders 32 S-70is, to be produced in Poland, the contracts has a value of $865 million.

Past contenders who showed interest but did not make an offer or did not pass the PQQ 
 Airbus Helicopters H160M Guepard
 Airbus Helicopters H225M Caracal
 Bell UH-1Y Venom
 Bell 525 Relentless.
 Bell Boeing V-22 Osprey
 NHIndustries NH90
 AceHawk Aerospace ML-70 Separate from the Sikorsky proposal, AceHawk Aerospace was offering a fleet of pre-owned and upgraded UH-60A/L Black Hawks, known as the AceHawk ML-70.  ML70 to be produced on a brownfield site at Teesside International Airport and equipped with the same engines as British Army Air Corp's Apache AH64E, whilst using the Defensive Aids Suite developed by UK Team Pellonia.  The airport will also house a Maintenance Repair & Overhaul (MRO) and Post Design Services (PDS)

See also 

 Future of the British Army
 Future of the Royal Air Force

References

External links 

 New Medium Helicopter contract notice at GOV.UK

United Kingdom defence procurement
United Kingdom military aircraft procurement program